Ariguaní River is a river in northern Colombia's Caribbean Region born in the Sierra Nevada de Santa Marta mountain range in the area of the municipality of Pueblo Bello. The Ariguaní is an affluent of the Cesar River  and flows from north to south into it near the town of El Paso. The Ariguaní River is also a natural and political border between the Cesar and Magdalena Departments.

Basin
 Mallorquin stream
 El Jobo
 Las Mulas
 Garrapaso
 Espíritu Santo
 Las Pavas Creek

References
Bosconia - hydrography

Rivers of Colombia